Harry Goldstein was born in Antopol, Russia and served in the Florida House of Representatives for Fernandina Beach, Florida.

He joined the United States Army as a Quartermaster officer in 1918.

Goldstein became Tax Collector for the City of Miami in 1936.

He died on November 4, 1944 and is buried in Miami.

Civic Activities
Goldstein was Commander of the Harvey W Seeds American Legion Post #29 in Miami.  He was active in the Elks Club, MOWW, Mahi Temple Shrine

References

External links 

American Jewish Year Book. United States, American Jewish Committee, 1913.
The Universal Jewish Encyclopedia . An Authoritative and Popular Presentation of Jews and Judaism.  Vol 9, 1939.
Findagrave

Sources
 

Members of the Florida House of Representatives
1878 births
1944 deaths
Emigrants from the Russian Empire to the United States